Monopis ethelella is a moth of the family Tineidae first described by Edward Newman in 1856. It is found in Australia and New Zealand.

References

Hieroxestinae
Moths described in 1856
Moths of New Zealand
Moths of Australia
Taxa named by Edward Newman